Kiepe Electric GmbH (formerly Vossloh Kiepe) is a German manufacturer of electrical traction equipment for trams, trolleybuses  other road and rail transport vehicles, as well as air-conditioning and heating systems, and conveyor device components.  Founded in 1906, it was known as Kiepe Elektrik GmbH until 2003, when it was renamed Vossloh Kiepe, following its acquisition by Vossloh AG.  Vossloh sold the company to Knorr-Bremse in January 2017, and in May 2017 Knorr renamed it Kiepe Electric GmbH.

History
In 1906, Theodor Kiepe created an electric arc lamp repair workshop in Düsseldorf. Over the next 40 years the company's product range grew to include electrical switches, then electrical drum controllers and resistors for electric vehicles. By 1951, the product range included electro-pneumatic contactors, and traction motors; in 1952, the company supplied equipment for an order of 700 trolleybuses for Argentina.

Between the 1950s and 1970s Kiepe Elektrik GmbH expanded, with formation of subsidiaries. In 1959 in Wien, Austria Kiepe Elektrik GmbH took over a small manufacturing company forming Kiepe Bahn und Kran Electric Ges.m.b.H. and additionally founded  Kiepe Italiana di Elettricità s.p.a., later named Kiepe Electric spa, in Milan, Italy. In 1973, Kiepe Electric GmbH was acquired by ACEC of Belgium. In 1983, the company was acquired from ACEC by Alstom, then by AEG in 1993. During this time Kiepe had become a provider of electrical traction equipment for light rail vehicles.

In 1995, AEG formed Adtranz with ABB by merging their transportation divisions. As this created a duopoly of electric traction equipment manufacturers in Germany, the European Commission ruled that the Kiepe subsidiary had to be sold; in 1996, Schaltbau AG acquired the company. In the early 2000s the company expanded into the North American and Italian markets.

On 14 September 2002, Vossloh AG acquired Kiepe Elektrik GmbH, and in 2003 the company was renamed Vossloh Kiepe GmbH.

In mid-2012, UK-based engineering consultancy Transys Projects Ltd. was acquired. The acquisition was renamed Vossloh Kiepe UK in late 2012. In late 2013, the company, Serbian company Zelvoz and the city of Novi Sad reached an agreement for the establishment of a rail vehicle air conditioning unit factory. In 2014, as part of a restructuring by its parent company, Vossloh Kiepe discontinued its mainline traction equipment activities (Vossloh Kiepe Main Line Technology GmbH).

In December 2016, Vossloh AG announced that it was selling Vossloh Electrical Systems, of which Vossloh Kiepe was a part, to Knorr-Bremse, and the sale was completed in late January 2017.

In May 2017, new parent Knorr-Bremse announced the renaming of Vossloh Kiepe as Kiepe Electric GmbH, a restoration of its pre-Vossloh name but using English spelling.

Company structure under Vossloh
From 2002 through 2016, the company was part of the Vossloh group, as of 2009 part of the transportation division (Motive Power & Components) along with Vossloh Locomotives (Kiel, formerly MaK) and Vossloh España (formerly Meinfesa).

As of 2009, the company had five subsidiaries:
Vossloh Kiepe Main Line Technology GmbH (Germany)
Vossloh Kiepe Ges.m.b.H. (Austria)
APS electronic AG (Switzerland)
Vossloh Kiepe S.r.l. (Italy)
Vossloh Kiepe Corporation (Canada)

Products and services
The company's primary business is the supply and manufacture of electric equipment for rail vehicles, typically trams or LRVs (light rail vehicles); the company provides electrical traction converters, auxiliary power supplies, air conditioning and heating equipment. Entire trams and LRVs are typically supplied in association with other manufacturers. Also supplied are specialised electric rail vehicles, and equipment for the modernisation of older electrically powered mass transit vehicles. and traction equipment for trolley buses and hybrid electric buses.

The company often acts as a component supplier to larger integrated rail vehicle manufactures including Siemens, Alstom and Bombardier.

Components for conveyor belts are also made.

References

External links

Kiepe Electric website (English)

Vossloh
Manufacturing companies based in Düsseldorf
Electrical engineering companies of Germany